Artur Adson ( – 5 January 1977) was an Estonian poet, writer and theatre critic.

Early years 
Artur Adson (born Karl Arthur Adson) was born in Tartu and attended school in Tartu, Sänna and Võru. After graduating he first studied surveying in Pskov. In 1925–26, he studied literature at the University of Tartu. Artur Adson was a surveyor, journalist and theater critic in Estonia and Russia. He met his future wife Marie Under in 1913  and were married in 1927.

Literary career 

From 1917 Artur Adson was a member of the Siuru literary movement, which exerted great influence on the Estonian literature. Later Adson was also active in the Tarapita movement. In addition, Adson was one of the most outstanding poets in the Võro language of southern Estonia. As an often conservative theatrical and literary critic, he exercised influence on the cultural scene of the Republic of Estonia.

Exile 

With the Soviet occupation of Estonia Artur Adson and his wife fled into exile to Sweden. There, he found employment as an archivist. Both continued their interest in the Estonian literature. Adson died in Stockholm, aged 87. Both Adson and Under are interred at the Skogskyrkogården cemetery in Stockholm.

Poetry collections 
Henge palangoq (1917)
Vana laterna (1919)
Roosikrants (1920)
Kaduvik (1927)
Katai, kibuvits nink kivi (1928)
Pärlijõgi (1931)
Lehekülg ajaraamatust (1937)
Värsivakk (selected, compiled and foreword by Ivar Grünthal; 1959)
Rahumäe kannel (1973)
Luuletused (compiled by Oskar Kruus; 1990)

Plays 
Toomapäev (1928)
Neli kuningat (1931)
Lauluisa ja Kirjaneitsi (1930)
Kolmas tee (penned under the pseudonym Peeter Bollmann; 1932)
Iluduskuninganna (1933)
Elav kapital (1934)
Karu läheb mee lõksu (1936)
Üks tuvi lendab merele (1937)

Memoirs 
Käsikivi (1922)
Neli veskit (1946)
Väikelinna moosekant (1946)
Ise idas – silmad läänes (1948)
Siuru-raamat (1949)
Reisiraamat (1950)
Lahkumine (1951)
Kadunud maailm  (1954)

Theatre critiques and history 
Das estnische Theater (1933)
Vilet ja loorbereid (1938)
Teatriraamat: ajalugu ja isiklikke kogemusi (1958)

Children's books 
Nakits: lugu väikesest lõbusast ja targast koerast (1944)

References

External links 

 Artur Adson at Estonian Writers' Online Dictionary

1889 births
1977 deaths
People from Rõuge Parish
People from the Governorate of Livonia
Estonian male poets
20th-century Estonian poets
20th-century male writers
University of Tartu alumni
Estonian World War II refugees
Estonian emigrants to Sweden
Refugees in Sweden
Recipients of the Order of the White Star, 4th Class
Burials at Skogskyrkogården
Estonian critics